Savuku (Malay: sauku) is the Tamil word for whip, used both for domestic purposes and traditionally also in hand-to-hand fighting. Its combat application is taught in the Indian martial arts, most notably in silambam and kalaripayat, as well as Indo-Malay silat. Whip techniques in silambam are known as savuku adi and are generally performed from mid-range.

See also
International Silambam Committee
Kalaripayat
Weapons of silat

Notes

External links 
 Iconography of southern India Gabriel Jouveau-Dubreuil P. Geuthner, 1937 -Art -135 pages

Whips
Weapons of India
Indian melee weapons